Midnight at the Lost and Found is the third studio album by Meat Loaf, released in May 1983. This would be the final Meat Loaf release under Epic Records until The Very Best of Meat Loaf (1998).

Following a dispute with his former songwriter Jim Steinman, Meat Loaf was contractually obliged to release a new album. According to Meat Loaf, Steinman gave him "Total Eclipse of the Heart" and "Making Love Out of Nothing at All" for the album, but Meat Loaf's record company refused to pay for Steinman. The songs Steinman had given to Meat Loaf were then given to Bonnie Tyler and Air Supply respectively, which both became hits in their respective countries and worldwide. Struggling for time and with no resolution to his arguments with Steinman seemingly on the horizon (eventually, Steinman and Meat Loaf would sue one another), he was forced to find songwriters wherever he could, including writing the songs himself.

Meat Loaf is credited with being involved in the writing of numerous tracks on the album, including the title track. However, as Meat would later admit, he was not much of a songwriter and did not like the songs he had written for the album. It was also regarded by fans and critics alike as a poor effort whether compared to previous releases or on its own merit. Those same fans and critics were disappointed to see that the iconic pictures on the covers of Bat Out of Hell and Dead Ringer were replaced by a black-and-white photograph of Meat Loaf. (An Australian reissue sported a color image of Meat Loaf screaming on the cover).

J. D. Considine wrote in Musician: "I don't think I've ever heard a performer more desperately in need of a duet with Cher."

Track listing

Personnel
 Meat Loaf – lead vocals, backing vocals (10)
 Mark Doyle – guitars, piano (1, 2, 4), bass guitar (4), synthesizers (9), vocals (4, 5)
 Rick Derringer – guitars (2-4, 6-9), bass guitar (7)
 Tom Edmonds – guitars (4)
 Gary Rossington – guitars (8)
 Steve Buslowe – bass guitar
 Paul Jacobs – piano (3, 5, 6, 8-10)
 Dave Lebolt – synthesizer programming (9)
 Max Weinberg – drums
 Dale Krantz Rossington – featured female vocals (8)
 Chuck Kirkpatrick – vocals
 John Sambataro – vocals

Singles
"Razor's Edge", "If You Really Want To" and the title track were released as singles, but none made top chart positions. The song "Lost Love", which was originally recorded during the sessions for the album, was released as the B-side to "If You Really Want To". This track was only released on CD on the Australian edition of Hits Out of Hell. The title track was one of very few 1980s songs to feature on the hit album, The Very Best of Meat Loaf (1998).

Charts

References

Meat Loaf albums
1983 albums
Albums produced by Tom Dowd
Epic Records albums